Waldemar Philippi (13 April 1929 – 4 October 1990) was a German footballer who played internationally for Saarland.

References

External links
 
 

1929 births
1990 deaths
Association football defenders
Saar footballers
Saarland international footballers
1. FC Saarbrücken players